Dan Daniel may refer to:

 Dan Daniel (sportswriter) (1890–1981), American sportswriter
 Dan Daniel (radio personality) (1930s–2016), disc jockey based in New York
 Dan Daniel (politician) (1914–1988), U.S. Representative from Virginia
 Daniel K. Daniel (born 1986), Nigerian actor, model, voice-over artiste and events compere

See also
Daniel Daniels (disambiguation)